Oreichthys incognito is a small cyprinid fish often found in the Kunthipuzha River in Kerala.

References

Fish of India
Oreichthys
Fish described in 2015